Mobile Suit Victory Gundam is a 1993 Japanese science fiction anime television series created and directed by Yoshiyuki Tomino and produced by Bandai Visual, Sotsu Agency, Sunrise, and TV Asahi, with music production by Starchild Records and Apollon. Spanning 51 episodes, Mobile Suit Victory Gundam is the final television series following the Universal Century timeline in the Gundam franchise. The series premiered in Japan on TV Asahi on April 2, 1993, and concluded on March 25, 1994.

Four pieces of theme music are used over the course of the series—two opening themes and two closing themes. The opening theme for the first thirty-one episodes is "Stand Up to the Victory" by Tomohisa Kawasoe, and the opening theme for the remaining twenty episodes is "Don't Stop! Carry On!" by RD.

Episode list

References

Mobile Suit Victory Gundam
Victory